The Board of Education for the City of York (YBE), also known as the York Board of Education is the former school district serving the Toronto suburb of York, Ontario. In 1998, it became part of the Toronto District School Board and the headquarters of the school board continues to be used as the TDSB's Continuing Education Office.

Schools
As the district merged into the TDSB, its schools were:

Elementary and middle

 Charles E. Webster Public School
 Cedarvale Community School
 Cordella Junior Public School
 Dennis Avenue Community School
 F.H. Miller Junior Public School
 Fairbank Public School
 Fairbank Memorial Public School
 General Mercer Junior Public School
 George Syme Community School
 Harwood Public School
 Humbercrest Public School
 Humewood Community School
 J.R. Wilcox Community School
 Kane Middle School - merged within Silverthorn before 2011
 Lambton Park Community School
 Rawlinson Community School
 Roselands Junior Public School
 Silverthorn Community School - moved to old site of Kane Middle School 2011 and old site on Ypres Road re-developed
 Warren Park Junior Public School

Secondary

Secondary schools:
 George Harvey Collegiate Institute (1953)
 Frank Oke Vocational School
 Runnymede Collegiate Institute (1927)
 Vaughan Road Academy (1927; closed in 2017)
 Weston Collegiate Institute (1857)
 York Humber High School (1967)
 York Memorial Collegiate Institute (1929)
 Adult Day School (Moved to Yorkdale site; former D.B. Hood Community School and now Lycée Français de Toronto)

References

External links

 Board of Education for the City of York (Archive)

Former school districts in Ontario
Education in Toronto